OCMA may refer to:
Orange County Museum of Art, an art museum in Newport Beach, California
Orange Coast Musical Arts, a homeschool marching band in Orange County, California
Oregon Council on Multiracial Affairs, an affiliate of the Association of MultiEthnic Americans in Portland, Oregon
Oxford Centre for Maritime Archaeology, a research group at Oxford University, England